Mount DeWitt is a mountain in the Head Mountains,  high, rising above the ice plateau just west of Mount Littlepage and the Willett Range, in Victoria Land. It was named by the Advisory Committee on Antarctic Names in 1964 for Hugh H. DeWitt, scientific leader on the Eltanin, 1962–63, who also served on the Glacier, 1958–59.

References 

Mountains of Oates Land